ε Monocerotis, Latinised as Epsilon Monocerotis, is the Bayer designation of a binary star system in the equatorial constellation Monoceros. Its location is a guide for sky navigation toward the Rosette Nebula.

The white-hued primary component has a stellar classification of A5 IV, suggesting it is an aging subgiant star. Its apparent magnitude is 4.39 and it is approximately 122 light years away based on parallax. It is reportedly a spectroscopic binary with a period around 331 days.

The B component, at a separation of around 12.3", is a yellow-white hued F-type main-sequence star of class F5 V and an apparent magnitude of 6.72.

References 

A-type subgiants
F-type main-sequence stars
Binary stars
Monoceros (constellation)
Monocerotis, Epsilon
BD+04 1236
Monocerotis, 08
044769
030419
2298